Urodeta hibernella is a moth of the family Elachistidae. It is known from France, Corsica and the Iberian Peninsula.

The larvae feed on Cistus monspeliensis and Helianthemum. They mine the leaves of their host plant. The mine consists of an elongated, slightly puckered, full depth blotch, without an initial corridor. The frass is concentrated in the lowest part of the mine. After a while, the larvae leave their mine and restart elsewhere. Pupation takes place outside of the mine.

References

Elachistidae
Moths described in 1859
Moths of Europe
Taxa named by Otto Staudinger